Chitose Karasuma may refer to:

Chitose Karasuma, a character in the media franchise Galaxy Angel
Chitose Karasuma, a character in the media franchise Girlish Number